Idotea phosphorea is a species of isopod in the family Idoteidae. It is found in North America.

References

Valvifera
Articles created by Qbugbot
Crustaceans described in 1873